Oleg Mikhaylovich Grams (born 20 February 1984) is a former Russian handball player for the Russian national team.

He competed at the 2008 Summer Olympics in Beijing, where the Russian team placed sixth.

References

External links

1984 births
Living people
Sportspeople from Krasnodar
Russian male handball players
Olympic handball players of Russia
Handball players at the 2008 Summer Olympics
Expatriate handball players
Russian expatriate sportspeople in France
Russian handball coaches